L'État, c'est moi ("I am the state", lit. "the state, that is me") is an apocryphal saying attributed to Louis XIV, King of France and Navarre, it was allegedly said on  before the Parliament of Paris. It is supposed to recall the primacy of the royal authority in a context of defiance with the Parliament, which contests royal edicts taken in lit de justice on 20 March 1655. The phrase symbolizes absolute monarchy and absolutism.

Nevertheless, historians contest that this sentence, which does not appear in the registers of the parliament, was really said by Louis XIV, especially since on his deathbed, Louis XIV pronounced a sentence, attested, completely contradictory: "I die, but the state will always remain."

The origin of the phrase is attributed to Pierre-Édouard Lémontey in his Essai sur l'établissement monarchique de Louis XIV et sur les altérations qu'il éprouva pendant la vie de ce prince (1818), who writes: "The Koran of France was contained in four syllables and Louis XIV pronounced them one day: "L'État, c'est moi!". As Olivier Chaline and Edmond Dziembowski point out, "if the forger is well forgotten today, his invention has not finished being used...".

Bibliography

References 

1655 in France
Political catchphrases
Louis XIV
Political quotes
Misquotations